Albert Massard (30 August 1900 – 8 January 1968) was a Luxembourgian footballer. He competed in the men's tournament at the 1924 Summer Olympics.

References

External links
 

1900 births
1968 deaths
Luxembourgian footballers
Luxembourg international footballers
Olympic footballers of Luxembourg
Footballers at the 1924 Summer Olympics
Sportspeople from Luxembourg City
Association football midfielders
CS Fola Esch players